Bell Island is an island in the Alexander Archipelago in Southeast Alaska, United States. George Vancouver first visited the island on August 12, 1793, in the evening dining on its south coast. Vancouver later named it "Bell's Island" after one of his crew, Midshipman Bell.

References

Islands of Alaska
Islands of Ketchikan Gateway Borough, Alaska